The 2015–16 season is KCCA F.C's 2nd season in the Uganda Premier League sponsored by AZAM TV and the league is reported by its commercial name the Azam Premier League, and their 49th consecutive season in the top-flight of Ugandan football. Along with the Uganda Premier League, the club will also compete in the Uganda Cup/Kakunguru Cup and the Cecafa Kagame Interclub Cup. The season covers the period from 15 July 2015 to 15 June 2016.

Prepations
Kampala Capital City Authority F.C introduced their road to 2015/2016 Season. They began with the major changes that is, it all began by the club C.E.O announcing their budget of 1.4 Billion Uganda Shillings in partnership with their major sponsors Startimes Uganda. And on the same occasion held on 19 June 2015 saw the C.E.O Jennifer Musisi announce their new coaching team of manager Mike Mutebi and Sam Simbwa as the second in command or as his assistant.

Pre-Friendlies

Kagame Inteclub Cup

Kampala Capital City Authority FC is participating in the 41st CECAFA interclub Cup and the 13th Cecafa Kagame Interclub Cup due to the sponsorship naming rights. KCCA will be representing Uganda because they merged as the Champions of Uganda's Top League in 2014.
Draws were held on 1 July 2015, the tournament that started on 18 July and is to end on 2 August 2015 in Dar es Salaam, Tanzania. KCCA FC was drawn in Group C with Malakia of South Sudan, Azam of Tanzania and Adama City of Ethiopia.

KCCA managed to get over a devastating start of the tournament after losing to Azam FC a team of the host nation and improving their performance on the pitch and mentally, winning the rest of the games in the group that enabled KCCA qualify to the Quarter finals with Six points.
With the side losing again to Azam in the semi-final game they were facing for the second time in the tournament, Kampala Capital City Authority FC came to win a bronze medal after showing a good display to the Sudanese side Khartoum National Team by 2-1.

|}

QUARTER FINALS

|}

SEMI FINALS

|}

LOSERS' MATCH

|}

Squad statistics

Statistics accurate as of match played 13.30hrs 2 August 2015

Transfers

In

Out

Loan in

Loan Out

References

Kampala Capital City Authority FC seasons